Vasile Moldovan (born 28 August 1911, date of death unknown) was a Romanian gymnast. He competed in eight events at the 1936 Summer Olympics.

References

1911 births
Year of death missing
Romanian male artistic gymnasts
Olympic gymnasts of Romania
Gymnasts at the 1936 Summer Olympics
Sportspeople from Cluj-Napoca